Ex-Arm (stylized as EX-ARM) is a Japanese science fiction manga series written by HiRock and illustrated by Shinya Komi. The series is a remake of Komi's earlier manga Ex-Vita. It was serialized in Shueisha's seinen manga magazine Grand Jump from February 2015 to December 2017, and later on Shueisha's Shōnen Jump+ website from December 2017 to June 2019. Shueisha compiled its chapters into fourteen tankōbon volumes.

A sequel manga titled Ex-Arm EXA began in Grand Jump Mucha in August 2019.

An anime television series adaptation by Visual Flight aired from January to March 2021.

Plot
In 2014, a high school student named Akira Natsume endures a phobia of electrical devices while also being very good at diagnosing them. He leads an average, unfulfilling life, and resolves to change himself for the better and get a girlfriend after being motivated by his older brother. Soon after, he suddenly dies in an accident. 16 years later, a young policewoman named Minami Uenozono and her android partner Alma retrieve and activate a highly advanced AI superweapon known as an "EX-ARM" and put it into full control of their ship as a last resort. The AI turns out to be Akira's brain, now in a digital form. The series revolves around the police force's attempts to suppress and defeat adversaries using EX-ARMs for their own purposes.

Characters

Media

Manga
Ex-Arm is written by HiRock and illustrated by Shinya Komi. A first series, written and illustrated by Komi, titled Ex-Vita, was published in Shueisha's seinen manga magazine Miracle Jump from December 13, 2011, to April 30, 2013. Shueisha collected is chapters into two tankōbon volumes, published on August 17, 2012, and June 19, 2013. Ex-Arm was published in Shueisha's Grand Jump from February 18, 2015 to December 6, 2017. The series was then transferred to the Shōnen Jump+ website and app, and ran from December 20, 2017 to June 26, 2019. Shueisha collected its chapters into fourteen tankōbon volumes, released from June 19, 2015, to August 19, 2019.

A sequel series, titled Ex-Arm EXA, was serialized in Grand Jump Mucha from August 28, 2019, to February 27, 2021. The first collected tankōbon volume was released on December 18, 2020. The second volume was released on March 18, 2021.

A manga adaptation of the novel EX-ARM the Novel Deus Ex Machina, titled Ex-Arm Another Code, was serialized in Shueisha's Ultra Jump from February 19 to November 19, 2020. The two collected tankōbon volumes were released on December 18, 2020, and January 19, 2021.

Volume list

Novel
A novel titled EX-ARM the Novel Deus Ex Machina, written by Atarō Kumo, was published by Shueisha under its Jump J-Books imprint on December 19, 2018.

Anime
An anime television series adaptation was announced on the release of the manga's 12th volume on December 18, 2018. The series is produced by Visual Flight and directed by Yoshikatsu Kimura, with Tommy Morton in charge of the scripts and Sō Kimura as composer. The main staff of the series have no previous experience with working on anime. Originally set for a July 2020 release, the series aired from January 11 to March 29, 2021 on Tokyo MX, SUN, and BS Fuji due to the COVID-19 pandemic. The opening theme is "Rise Again" performed by AIRFLIP, while the ending theme is "Diamonds Shine" performed by Dizzy Sunfist.

Reception
The first trailer of the anime was instantly met with heavy online backlash due to the poor quality of the computer-generated imagery (CGI) animation. The anime's animation continued to gain criticism as it aired, with some citing the anime staff's lack of experience in working in the industry as a likely culprit.

Notes

References

External links
  
 
 
 

2018 Japanese novels
2021 anime television series debuts
Action anime and manga
Anime postponed due to the COVID-19 pandemic
Anime series based on manga
Crime in anime and manga
Crunchyroll Originals
Cyberpunk anime and manga
Japanese webcomics
Muse Communication
Jump J-Books
Seinen manga
Shueisha manga
Tokyo MX original programming
Transhumanism in anime and manga
Webcomics in print